Gail Ilene Posner Karp (born in the mid 1950s in Detroit, Michigan) served as the cantor of the Reform Jewish synagogue Temple Emanuel in Davenport, Iowa from 1987 - 2016.  She is also employed by the Department of Defense.

Early life and education
Karp attended the Hebrew Union College - Jewish Institute of Religion, Debbie Friedman School of Sacred Music in New York City (HUC-JIR), where Gail was ordained as the fourth female Jewish Cantor in 1978, and subsequently received a master's degree in voice performance and musicology from University of Nebraska in 1980.  She became a member of the professional women’s music fraternity, Sigma Alpha Iota, while a student.

Early career
While in seminary, Gail Posner Karp served Temple Beth Torah on Long Island as their first cantor in the late 70’s. In the years that followed, she was affiliated with Temple Israel of Omaha and Congregation B’nai Jeshurun of Lincoln in Nebraska, Temple Beth El of Aptos and Temple Emanuel of San Jose. She was the first credentialed, licensed cantor to serve these congregations.

Advocacy
In 1986, the Karps’ middle child, Joshua, was diagnosed with autism at the University of Iowa Hospitals and Clinics, Division of Child Psychiatry.  The diagnosis resulted in a second career that included local, state and national leadership roles with the Autism Societies of the Quad Cities, state of Iowa and nationally from the mid-80’s until the turn of the century.  During this time, Gail Karp was also appointed to the Iowa Governor’s Task Force on Autism, worked on the establishment of the Autism Tissue Program, and consulted with numerous other funded special projects of regional and national significance (SPRANS grant programs) that impacted the lives of persons with disabilities.  Cantor Karp has served on the editorial boards of The Journal of Information and Referral Services, The Advocate (a quarterly publication of the Autism Society of America), and the Iowa COMPASS.  In 2003, she received an honorary doctorate from the Hebrew Union College, citing her work on behalf of this special population.  The Jewish value of tikkun olam (repairing the world) continues to serve as a theme in her life.

Private life
Karp is married to Rabbi Henry Karp, rabbi emeritus of Temple Emanuel in Davenport.  They have three children. According to Henry Karp, he and Gail Posner Karp were the first Rabbi-Cantor clergy couple to become engaged and married during their seminary studies at HUC (1973–1978).

Fund Development
Shortly after the initial diagnosis of her son, Karp expanded her efforts to include improving the quality of life for all persons with autism (and, as time progressed, persons who experience disabilities with both related and disparate diagnoses).  The skills she developed as a Jewish cultural arts event initiator and organizational leader of volunteer organizations enabled her to transition seamlessly into the fundraising profession.  Karp had been affiliated with the Association of Fundraising Professionals (including service as a Chapter President) and met the requirements for a professional designation as a Certified Fundraising Professional (CFRE) in 2000. Additional certification included a Grant Professional Credential (GPC).

Other professional memberships have included The Partnership for Philanthropic Planning (formerly the National Committee for Planned Giving, where she served as a local council past president) and the American Conference of Cantors (both as a past board member and as a member on numerous committees).

Publications and writings
 The Aleynu: A Missinai Melody as sung by the Jews of Blois, France], University  of Nebraska – Lincoln, (1980)
 The Evolution of the Aleynu, 1171 to the present], Journal of Synagogue Music 12, no. 1 (1982): 3-23
 Muslim-Jewish Dialogue Activity Guide 
 Devar Torah

Other activities

 Interfaith Education Forum on Human Trafficking
 Detroit Arsenal Holocaust Observance
 Lehrhaus Judaica Instructor, Stanford University
 Interfaith Peace Rally

References

Sources
Quad City Times Retirement Tribute May 30, 2017
Quad City Times Tribute and Biography May 30, 2017
Jewish Post,Indianapolis, Marion County, 12 June 1985
The Lincoln Star, Lincoln, Nebraska 6 November, 1977   
Jerusalem Post, 4 April 2019

Living people
Hazzans
Women hazzans
People from Detroit
American Jews
Hebrew Union College – Jewish Institute of Religion alumni
University of Nebraska alumni
Year of birth missing (living people)